Claiborne County is the name of more than one county in the United States:

 Claiborne County, Mississippi 
 Claiborne County, Tennessee

See also 

 Claiborne Parish, Louisiana